Chu Yimin (born July 1953) is a retired general of the Chinese People's Liberation Army (PLA). He was the inaugural Political Commissar of the Northern Theater Command, and previously served as Political Commissar of the Shenyang Military Region.

Biography
Chu Yimin was born in July 1953 in Rugao, Jiangsu. He joined the PLA in 1969, and the Chinese Communist Party in December 1972. He formerly served in the Xinjiang Military District and Nanjing Military Region, and became Political Commissar of the Shenyang Military Region in 2010. He attained the rank of major general in July 2003, lieutenant general (zhong jiang) in July 2008, and full general in July 2014.

Chu was an alternate member of the 17th Central Committee of the Chinese Communist Party (2007−12), and a full member of the 18th Central Committee.

References

1953 births
Living people
People's Liberation Army generals from Jiangsu
People from Rugao
Alternate members of the 17th Central Committee of the Chinese Communist Party
Members of the 18th Central Committee of the Chinese Communist Party